Sayyid Husain Khing Sawar or Hussein Khangsawar, also known as Miran Sahib, was the garrison commander (qiladar) of Taragarh Fort in Ajmer. Muhammad of Ghor , he appointed Husain as his chief tax collector. A shrine was erected there in his honour, near Mu'in ad-Din Chishti's shrine.

References

Year of birth missing
History of Ajmer
1202 deaths